The Doors is a 1991 American biographical musical film directed by Oliver Stone who also writer with J. Randal Johnson. The film stars Val Kilmer as lead singer and songwriter Jim Morrison, Meg Ryan as Pamela Courson (Morrison's girlfriend), Kyle MacLachlan as keyboardist Ray Manzarek, Frank Whaley as lead guitarist Robby Krieger, Kevin Dillon as drummer John Densmore, Billy Idol as Cat and Kathleen Quinlan as journalist Patricia Kennealy. The film tells the story and life of Jim Morrison, the lead singer of the American rock band the Doors, and the band's success of their music and influential counterculture.

The film portrays Morrison as a larger-than-life icon of 1960s rock and roll and counterculture, including portrayals of Morrison's recreational drug use, free love, hippie lifestyle, alcoholism, interest in hallucinogenic drugs as entheogens, and, particularly, his growing obsession with death, presented as threads which weave in and out of the film.

Released by Tri-Star Pictures on March 1, 1991, The Doors grossed $34 million worldwide against its $32 million production budget and received mixed reviews from critics, audience and fans of the band alike. Kilmer's performance as Morrison was widely praised as well as the supporting cast, the cinematography, the production design and Stone's directing. However, it received backlash for its historical inaccuracy and how Morrison was portrayed.

Plot 

In 1949, young Jim Morrison and his family are traveling on a desert highway in New Mexico where they encounter an auto wreck and see an elderly Native American dying by the roadside. In 1965, Jim arrives in California and is assimilated into the Venice Beach culture. During his tenure studying at UCLA, he meets Pamela Courson and they fall in love, becoming a couple. He also meets Ray Manzarek for the first time, as well as Robby Krieger and John Densmore, all of whom form "The Doors" with Morrison.

Jim convinces his bandmates to travel to Death Valley and experience the effects of psychedelic drugs. Returning to Los Angeles, they play several shows at the famous Whisky a Go Go nightclub and develop a rabid fanbase. Jim's onstage antics and lewd performance of the group's song "The End" upset the club's owners, and the band is ejected from the venue. After the show, they are approached by producer Paul A. Rothchild and Jac Holzman of Elektra Records and are offered a deal to record their first album. The Doors are soon invited to perform on The Ed Sullivan Show, only to be told by one of the producers that they must change the lyric "girl we couldn't get much higher" in the song "Light My Fire", due to a reference to drugs. Despite this, Morrison performs the original lyric during the live broadcast and the band is not allowed to perform on the show again.

As the Doors' success continues, Jim becomes increasingly infatuated with his own image as "The Lizard King" and develops an addiction to alcohol and drugs. Jim becomes intimate with rock journalist Patricia Kennealy, who involves him in her witchcraft activities, participating in a mystical handfasting ceremony. Meanwhile, an elder spirit watches these events.

The rest of the band grows weary of Jim's missed recording sessions and absences at concerts. Jim arrives late and intoxicated to a Miami, Florida concert, becoming increasingly confrontational towards the audience and allegedly exposing himself onstage. The incident is a low point for the band, resulting in criminal charges against Jim, cancellations of shows, breakdowns in Jim's personal relationships, and resentment from the other band members.

In 1970, following a lengthy trial, Jim is found guilty of indecent exposure and ordered to serve time in prison. However, he is allowed to remain free on bail, pending the results of an appeal. Patricia tells Jim that she is pregnant with his child, but Jim convinces her to have an abortion. Jim visits his bandmates for the final time, attending a birthday party hosted by Ray where he wishes the band luck in their future endeavors and gives each of them a copy of his poetry book An American Prayer. As Jim plays in the front garden with the children, he sees that one of them is his childhood self and comments, "This is the strangest life I've ever known" (a lyric from the Doors song "Waiting for the Sun"), before passing out.

In 1971, Jim and Pam move to Paris, France to escape the pressures of the L.A. lifestyle. One evening, on July 3, 1971, Pam finds Jim dead in the bathtub of their apartment. The film's final scenes before the credits roll are of Jim's gravesite in Père Lachaise Cemetery in Paris, while "A Feast of Friends" (Adagio) plays in the background. Just before the closing credits, the screen whites out and text appears stating that "Jim is said to have died of heart failure. He was 27. Pam joined him three years later."

During the closing credits, the band is shown recording the song "L.A. Woman" in the studio.

Cast

Production

Development 

Film directors Brian De Palma, Martin Scorsese and William Friedkin had all flirted with making a Doors biopic over the years. In 1985, Columbia Pictures acquired the rights from the Doors and the Morrison estate to make a film. Producer Sasha Harari wanted filmmaker Oliver Stone to write the screenplay but never heard back from his agent. After two unsatisfactory scripts were produced, Imagine Films replaced Columbia. Harari contacted Stone again and the director met with the surviving band members, telling them he wanted to keep a particularly wild scene from one of the early drafts. The group was offended by this and exercised their right of approval over the director, rejecting Stone.

By 1989, Mario Kassar and Andrew Vajna, who owned Carolco Pictures, had acquired the rights to the project and wanted Stone to direct it. The Doors had seen Stone's film Platoon (1986) and were impressed with what he had done, and Stone agreed to make the film after his next project, Evita. After spending years working on Evita and courting both Madonna and Meryl Streep to play the titular role, the film fell apart over salary negotiations with Streep and Stone quickly moved into pre-production for The Doors.

Guitarist Robby Krieger had always opposed a Doors biopic until Stone signed on to direct. Conversely, keyboardist Ray Manzarek had traditionally been the biggest advocate of immortalizing the band on film but opposed Stone's involvement. He was not happy with the direction that Stone was going to take with the film and refused to give his approval. According to actor Kyle MacLachlan, "I know that he and Oliver weren't speaking. I think it was hard for Ray, he being the keeper of the Doors myth for so long". According to Krieger, "when the Doors broke up Ray had his idea of how the band should be portrayed and John and I had ours". Manzarek stated that he was not asked to consult on the film and wanted it to be about all four band members equally, rather than the focus being on Morrison. Conversely, Stone stated that he repeatedly tried to get Manzarek involved, but "all he did was rave and shout. He went on for three hours about his point of view... I didn't want Ray to be dominant, but Ray thought he knew better than anybody else". As Krieger revealed in his book Set the Night on Fire, Manzarek was also jealous of Stone because he wanted to direct the film himself.

Screenplay 
Stone first heard the Doors in 1967, when he was a 21-year-old soldier in Vietnam. Before filming started, Stone and his producers had to negotiate with the three surviving band members and their label, Elektra Records, as well as the parents of both Morrison and his girlfriend Pamela Courson. Morrison's parents would only allow themselves to be depicted in a dream-like flashback sequence at the beginning of the film. The Coursons wanted there to be no suggestion in any way that Pamela caused Morrison's death. Stone found the Coursons the most difficult to deal with because they wanted Pamela to be portrayed as "an angel". While researching the film, Stone read through transcripts of interviews with over 100 people. Stone finally penned the film script in the summer of 1989, later stating that "The Doors script was always problematic. Even when we shot, but the music helped fuse it together". Stone first picked the songs he wanted to use and then wrote "each piece of the movie as a mood to fit that song". The Coursons did not like Stone's script and tried to slow the production down by refusing to allow any of Morrison's later poetry to be used in the film. (When Morrison died, Courson acquired the rights to Morrison's poetry; when she died, her parents got the rights.)

Casting 
For nearly 10 years prior to production, the project went through development hell after being considered by many studios and directors. Several actors, including Tom Cruise, Johnny Depp, John Travolta and Richard Gere, were each considered for the role of Morrison when the project was still in development in the 1980s, with Bono of U2 and Michael Hutchence of INXS also expressing interest in the role. Stone initially offered the role to Ian Astbury of the Cult, who declined the role because he was not happy with the way Morrison was going to be represented in the film.

When Stone began talking about the project in 1988, he had Val Kilmer in mind to play Morrison, after seeing him in the Ron Howard fantasy film Willow. Kilmer had the same kind of singing voice as Morrison and, to convince Stone that he was right for the role, spent several thousand dollars of his own money and made his own eight-minute audition video, singing and looking like Morrison at various stages of his life. To prepare for the role, Kilmer lost weight and spent six months rehearsing Doors songs every day; the actor learned 50 songs, 15 of which are actually performed in the film. Kilmer also spent hundreds of hours with the Doors' producer Paul A. Rothchild, who related "anecdotes, stories, tragic moments, humorous moments, how Jim thought... interpretation of Jim's lyrics". Rothchild also took Kilmer into the studio and helped him with "some pronunciations, idiomatic things that Jim would do that made the song sound like Jim". Kilmer also met with Krieger and Densmore but Manzarek refused to talk to him. When the Doors heard Kilmer singing they could not tell whether the voice was Kilmer's or Morrison's.

Stone auditioned approximately 60 actresses for the role of Pamela Courson. The role required nudity and the script featured sex scenes, which generated a fair amount of controversy. Casting director Risa Bramon felt that Patricia Arquette auditioned very well and should have gotten the role. To prepare for the role, Meg Ryan talked to the Coursons and people that knew Pamela. Before doing the film, she was not familiar with Morrison and "liked a few songs", adding, "I had to reexamine all my beliefs about [the 1960s] in order to do this movie". In doing research, she also encountered several conflicting views of Pamela.

Krieger acted as a technical advisor on the film, chiefly to show his cinematic alter ego, Frank Whaley, where to put his fingers on the guitar fretboard during the mimed performance sequences. Similarly, Densmore also acted as a consultant on the film, tutoring Kevin Dillon.

Principal photography 
With a budget set at $32 million, The Doors was filmed over 13 weeks, predominantly in and around Los Angeles, California; Paris, France; New York City, New York; and the Mojave Desert. Stone originally hired Paula Abdul to choreograph the film's concert scenes, who dropped out of the project because she did not understand Morrison's on-stage actions and was not familiar with the time period. Abdul recommended Bill and Jacqui Landrum, who watched hours of concert footage before working with Kilmer and got him to do dance exercises to loosen up his upper body and jumping routines to develop his stamina.

During the concert scenes, Kilmer did his own singing, performing over the Doors' master tapes without Morrison's lead vocals, avoiding lip-synching. Kilmer's endurance was put to the test during the concert sequences, which took several days to film, with Stone stating "his voice would start to deteriorate after two or three takes. We had to take that into consideration". One sequence, filmed inside the Whisky a Go Go, proved to be more difficult than others due to all the smoke and sweat, a result of the body heat and intense camera lights. "The End" sequence took five days to shoot, spanning 24 takes for Stone to get what he wanted, after which Kilmer was completely exhausted.

Controversy arose during filming when a memo linked to Kilmer circulated among cast and crew members, listing rules of how the actor was to be treated for the duration of principal photography. These provisions forbade people to approach him on set without good reason, address him by his own name while he was in character or stare at him on set. An upset Stone contacted Kilmer's agent and the actor claimed it was all a huge misunderstanding and that the memo was for his own people and not the film crew.

Soundtrack 

The film contains over two dozen of the Doors' songs, although only half of these appear on the accompanying soundtrack album. In the film, original recordings of the band are combined with vocal performances by Kilmer himself,  although none of Kilmer's performances appear on the soundtrack album. In addition, two songs by the Velvet Underground ("Heroin" and "Venus in Furs"), are also heard throughout the film, with the former appearing on the soundtrack.

Historical accuracy 

The film is based mostly on real people and actual events, with some segments reflecting Stone's vision and dramatization of those people and events. For example, when Morrison is asked to change the infamous lyric in "Light My Fire" for his appearance on The Ed Sullivan Show, he is depicted as blatantly ignoring their request, defiantly shouting the words "higher! Yeah!" into the television camera. However, during the actual broadcast, Morrison had simply sung the vocal with the same emphasis as on the record. Morrison later said the inclusion of "higher" in the live version was an accident, and that he had meant to change the lyric but was so nervous about performing on live television that he simply forgot to change it. Conversely, Ray Manzarek said the Doors only pretended to agree to the changing of words and deliberately played the song as they always had, albeit without any added emphasis on the offending words. Kilmer as Morrison is also shown incorrectly wearing a black shirt in the scene, when in reality Morrison had wore a white shirt and black leather jacket for his performance on the show.

Another inaccuracy can be found in the character of a seductive female magazine photographer played by Mimi Rogers, who appears to be based on 16 magazine editor Gloria Stavers. (The dialogue in this scene is based on a conversation Stavers had with Morrison during a photo session in her Manhattan apartment.) This character is portrayed as having taken the famous "young lion" picture of Jim Morrison in New York City in 1967, when in fact this particular photograph (as well as nearly all the other publicity photographs for the Doors' first album) were taken by a male photographer, Joel Brodsky, in Los Angeles in November 1966.

Several acts of violence portrayed in the film are also disputed: Morrison is inaccurately depicted as locking Pamela Courson in a closet and setting it on fire; having a violent argument with Courson at a Thanksgiving celebration, where they both threaten each other with a knife; and angrily throwing a television set at Manzarek for licensing the use of "Light My Fire" in a Buick television commercial. Even though Manzarek was frank about Morrison's tendency to go into senseless rages, participants in the film agree that Stone took many liberties in fabricating events and that none of these incidents actually occurred. Stone himself readily admits in the DVD director's commentary that the Thanksgiving scene never actually took place, nor the scene when the band members travel to a desert where Morrison encourages them to trip into psychedelic drugs.

Dialogue from Kennealy that took place between her and Morrison is reassigned to Courson, and Courson is depicted as saying hostile things to Kennealy, when by Kennealy's reports their interactions were polite. Kennealy is also portrayed as being the girl Morrison was with in the shower stall backstage before the December 9, 1967 New Haven concert, when in fact he was having a conversation with a local teenage co-ed from Southern Connecticut State University. Additionally, the New Haven venue is presented in the film as a gorgeous amphitheater with a large balcony and a packed audience, when in reality it was a rather decrepit, half-empty hockey rink with audience members sitting on foldable wooden chairs. Similarly, in an earlier scene of a press conference set in New York City in 1967, when Kennealy is first introduced to Morrison, the singer is asked a question regarding "the dreadful reviews your new poetry book has got"; at that time, Morrison had not yet published any volumes of his poetry.

John Densmore is portrayed as hating Morrison when the singer's personal and drug problems begin to dominate his behavior. However, Densmore states in his biography Riders on the Storm that he never directly confronted Morrison about his behavior. Other questionable portrayals include those of Andy Warhol, who is presented as a leering homosexual. 

Krieger, Densmore and Kennealy are all credited as technical advisors for the film; however, they have all commented that, although they may have given advice, Stone often chose to ignore it in favor of his own vision of the story. The settings for the film, particularly the concert sequences, are depicted in mostly chronological order, although the crowd scenes contain many blatant exaggerations, such as portrayals of public nudity, bonfires, and group revelries that did not occur. For example, in the concert sequences naked women are shown prancing around onstage, when in reality Densmore said that didn't happen in any of the Doors' concerts.

In the film's climactic scene of the infamous concert at the Dinner Key Auditorium in Miami on March 1, 1969, Morrison is shown as leaving the stage to join the audience for a singalong medley of "Break on Through" and "Dead Cats, Dead Rats", a portrayal which is likewise exaggerated and inaccurate. Previously in the scene, Morrison is heard shouting to the audience "You're all bunch of fucking slaves!" but in reality he actually said "You're bunch of fucking idiots!", although he did call the audience "slaves" later in his rant.  Also, prior to the concert, a reporter on the scene makes a derogatory comment about the band's fourth studio album, The Soft Parade, which had not yet been completed and would not be released until July of that year. Additionally, Krieger said that he didn't take acid prior to the start of the concert as depicted in the film.

The surviving Doors members were all, to one degree or another, unhappy with the final film, and were said to have heavily criticized Stone's portrayal of Morrison as an "out of control sociopath." In a 1991 interview with Gary James, Manzarek criticized Stone for exaggerating Morrison's alcohol consumption in the movie: "Jim with a bottle all the time. It was ridiculous... It was not about Jim Morrison. It was about Jimbo Morrison, the drunk. God, where was the sensitive poet and the funny guy? The guy I knew was not on that screen." In the afterword of his book Riders on the Storm, Densmore says that the movie is based on "the myth of Jim Morrison" and criticizes the film for portraying Morrison's ideas as "muddled through the haze of the drink [alcohol]." In a 1994 interview, Krieger said that the film doesn't give the viewer "any kind of understanding of what made Jim Morrison tick." Krieger added, "They left a lot of stuff out. Some of it was overblown, but a lot of the stuff was very well done, I thought."

In Manzarek's biography of the Doors, Light My Fire, he often criticizes Stone and also includes myriad details that discredit Stone's account of Morrison. For example, in Stone's "re-creation" of Morrison's student film at UCLA, he has Morrison watching a D-Day sequence on television and shouting profanities in German, with a near-nude German exchange student dancing on top of the television sporting a swastika armband. According to Manzarek, the only similarity between Stone's version and Morrison's was that the girl in question was indeed German. Furthermore, Manzarek described Stone's version as a "grotesque exaggeration", and recalled that Morrison's film was a "much lighter, much friendlier, much funnier kind of thing."

As the credits point out and as Stone emphasizes in his DVD commentary, some characters, names, and incidents in the film are fictitious or amalgamations of real people. In the 1997 documentary, The Road of Excess, Stone states that Quinlan's character, Patricia Kennealy, is a composite, and in retrospect should have been given a fictitious name. Kennealy herself in particular was hurt by her portrayal in the film and strongly objected to a scene in the film where Morrison states that he did not take their handfasting ceremony seriously. Kennealy is credited as a Wiccan priestess for her cameo role although her appearance in the marriage involved into Celtic paganism.

Ryan's character, Pamela Courson, involves liberties of a different sort. The former Doors think the movie depiction of her is not accurate at all, as their book The Doors describes this version of Courson as "a cartoon of a girlfriend". Courson's parents had inherited Morrison's poems when their daughter died, and Stone had to agree to restrictions about his portrayal of her in exchange for the rights to use the poetry. In particular, Stone agreed to avoid any suggestion that Courson may have been responsible for Morrison's death. However, Alain Ronay and Courson herself had both said that she was responsible. In Riders on the Storm, Densmore says Courson said she felt terribly guilty because she had obtained drugs that she believed had either caused or contributed to Morrison's death.

Release and reception 
The Doors was entered into the 17th Moscow International Film Festival. In April 2019, a restored version of the film was selected to be shown in the Cannes Classics section at the 2019 Cannes Film Festival.

In a contemporary review, Roger Ebert gave The Doors two-and-a-half out of four stars. Ebert maintained that Stone failed to make any streaming depiction of the Doors and especially Morrison, but praised the acting performances, particularly Kilmer's. Conversely, Rolling Stone wrote a glowing review, rating it with four out of four stars. In a 2010 piece for Q magazine, Keith Cameron stated that "few people emerged from seeing the film having raised their opinions of that band and especially its singer Jim Morrison." The problem, as critic Cameron put it, was not so much that "Stone dwelled upon Morrison the inebriate, the philanderer, or the pretentious Lizard King", but rather the "clichéd Hollywood devices for sucking the wonder from the pioneering band: actors with fake hair saying silly things..." and "a self-important director's turgid attempts to make grand statements about America."

On Rotten Tomatoes, the film has a 57% approval rating based on 60 reviews and an average rating of 6.00/10. The site's consensus states: "Val Kilmer delivers a powerhouse performance as one of rock's most incendiary figures, but unfortunately, Oliver Stone is unable to shed much light on the circus surrounding the star." Metacritic reports a 62 out of 100 rating, based on 19 critics, indicating "generally favorable reviews."

Home media and The Final Cut
The Doors was released on DVD on August 14, 2001 and was later released on Blu-ray on August 12, 2008. The film was released on 4K Blu-ray on July 23, 2019, with a new version of the film dubbed The Final Cut. Supervised by Stone, it features remastered sound and removes a scene where Morrison, following his trial, almost commits suicide.

See also 

 List of films featuring hallucinogens
 When You're Strange – a documentary film about The Doors

References

Bibliography

External links 

 
 
 
 
 
 
 
 , a documentary of The Doors, included with the 2001 DVD

1991 films
1991 drama films
1990s American films
1990s biographical drama films
1990s English-language films
1990s musical drama films
American biographical drama films
American musical drama films
American rock music films
Biographical films about musicians
Carolco Pictures films
Cultural depictions of Jim Morrison
Cultural depictions of Andy Warhol
Films about musical groups
Films about death
Films directed by Oliver Stone
Films set in the 1960s
Films set in the 1970s
Films with screenplays by Oliver Stone
Imagine Entertainment films
Musical films based on actual events
StudioCanal films
TriStar Pictures films
The Doors